Calochortus fimbriatus is a California species of flowering plant in the lily family known by the common name late-blooming mariposa lily. It is native to the coastal mountain ranges of southern Monterey, San Luis Obispo, Santa Barbara and northern Ventura counties, where it is a member of the chaparral flora.

This species is listed as "rare, threatened or endangered in California and elsewhere" and "fairly endangered in California" (CNPS: 1B.2).

Description
Calochortus fimbriatus is a bulb-forming perennial herb producing a slender, branching stem 30 to 110 centimeters tall. There is a basal leaf up to 40 centimeters long which appears in January and withers long before the plant blooms in late June or early July. The bloom continues until mid-August. The inflorescence consists of 2 to 6 erect, bowl-shaped flowers. Each flower has three narrow sepals and three wider petals. The petals are usually tan or cream colored on the outside and yellowish on the inside with variable number of flecks of dark purple, and a coating of hairs on the inner surface and top rim. The fruit is a three-angled capsule. Calochortus fimbriatus blooms more vigorously the year after a wildfire.

References

External links
Jepson Manual Treatment
USDA Plants Profile

Calphotos Photo gallery, University of California @ Berkeley

fimbriatus
Endemic flora of California
Natural history of the California chaparral and woodlands
Natural history of the California Coast Ranges
Natural history of the Transverse Ranges
~
Natural history of Monterey County, California
Natural history of San Luis Obispo County, California
Natural history of Santa Barbara County, California
Natural history of Ventura County, California